The men's elimination race competition at the 2022 UEC European Track Championships was held on 14 August 2022.

Results

References

Men's elimination race
European Track Championships – Men's elimination race